Fodil Mezali (born in Thénia on 23 April 1959) is an Algerian journalist, editor-in-chief and managing editor.

Early life
Mezali was born in 1959 in the town of Thénia in the lower Kabylia region of Algeria, east of the Khachna Massif and south-east of the town of Boumerdès.

After primary and intermediate studies in Thénia, Mezali continued his secondary education at a high school in Algiers, where he obtained his baccalaureate in 1979, and then pursued studies in journalism at the University of Algiers.

Alger républicain
Mezali began his professional career as a journalist in the Alger républicain newspaper in July 1989.

Among his colleagues were Saïd Mekbel and Mohamed Benchicou. The newspaper ceased publication in December 1994.

Le Matin
Mezali founded the newspaper Le Matin in 1991 as the editor-in-chief with Saïd Mekbal and Mohamed Benchicou, while remaining a contributor of columns to the Algiers Republican.

Mezali left this daily when he was suspended on 26 July 2004 for non-payment of debts, and after its director, Mohamed Benchicou was imprisoned on 14 June 2004 for having written a pamphlet book on President Abdelaziz Bouteflika which he titled "Bouteflika, an Algerian Sham".

Le Quotidien d'Algérie
After the bankruptcy and closure of the newspaper Le Matin, Mezali contributed articles to several Algerian press titles from 2005 until 2012, such as Le Quotidien d'Algérie.

La Cité
Mezali waited seven years after the newspaper Le Matin'''s dissolution before returning to the Algerian journalistic scene by publishing, as a managing editor, a daily newspaper entitled La Cité, which published its first issue on 21 April 2013. It chose as its maxim on the editorial line, "The newspaper of a camp and not of a clan".

Tighremt
Mezali launched another publication with an experimental edition of the Kabyle-language newspaper Tighremt on 22 February 2020.

Having directed the French-language daily La Cité since 2012, he wanted to launch his Berber-speaking corollary Tighremt, whose first number was published on 29 February 2020.

Mezali handpicked for proven language skills in Tighremt's editorial team, made up primarily of Tamazight teachers. He commissioned a pair of seasoned specialists in the field, Djamel Ikhloufi and Yacine Zidane, to lead this press title. This Berber-speaking title comes from a bi-weekly and then weekly notebook inserted in the daily La Cité'' since 2015 for 550 issues.

See also
List of Algerians
List of Algerian writers
List of newspapers in Algeria
Alger républicain

Bibliography

External links

Le Matin newspaper website

References

Algerian journalists
1959 births
Living people
Algerian people
People from Thénia
People from Thénia District
People from Boumerdès Province
Kabyle people
University of Algiers alumni
Algerian male writers
Algerian writers in French
20th-century Algerian writers
21st-century Algerian writers
Algerian columnists
Managing editors
Print editors
Newspaper editors
African newspaper editors